Martha Ankomah is a Ghanaian film actress and an entrepreneur

Personal life and education 
Ankomah was born in Accra, Ghana, as the first-born of her single mother, Ankomah recalled encountering several challenges during her childhood. She is an alumna of Adabraka Presbyterian Junior High School, Labone Senior High School and Jayee University College.

Career 
According to her, she delved into acting through her cousin in 1994. After taking part in several auditions for movies, and acting in some television serials and film productions, she entered into Next Movie Star, where she was placed third in the 2007 edition of the reality show. Ankomah disclosed during an interview with Hitz FM in 2016 that henceforth she would only consider roles that are morally just and bring about positive change in the society. In September 2018, she clarified her position, explaining that she can assume any role in a film as long as it passes a positive message to its audience. In 2017, Ankomah was criticized by some film stakeholders when she questioned the superficial narrative of Ghanaian films. She expressed concern that the industry need to change the theme of their films to develop. Film directors felt her statement was disrespectful and lacking in knowledge of the art of film-making. In November 2018, she began a campaign that seeks to encourage young people to read.

Filmography 
 Suncity
 St. James Hotel
 All that Glitters
 Where is your Mobile?
 Power of the gods
 Shakira
 Sin of the Soul
 Heart of Men
 Somewhere in Africa
 Sugar Town
 A Trip To Hell

Accolades 
 2010 Africa Movie Academy Award for Most Promising Actor
 2012 Africa Movie Academy Award for Most Promising Actor
 2012 Ghana Movie Awards - Best actress in a lead role
 2011 Ghana Movie Awards - Best actress in a Supporting role
 2011 Ghana Movie Awards - Favourite actress (movie)
 2015 Ghana Movie Awards - Best actress in a lead role

Business and ventures

Endorsements 
In 2014, Ankomah signed an endorsement deal with Vitamilk Viora. Dusk Capital Limited, a Ghanaian Investment Bank in 2017 revealed Ankomah as their brand ambassador. She has worked with Globacom since 2018 as a brand ambassador. In 2018, Ankomah was named the brand ambassador for Ghana Textiles Printers' (GTP) new fabric 'Adepa Dumas'.

In August 2021, she endorsed Latif Abubakar's 'Something must kill a man' play in a video where she claimed the play had a lot to offer to the public.

Beauty Business 
In July 2013, Ankomah officially opened her beauty salon 'Martha's Place' in Accra. The salon offers treatments for men and women.

Foundation 
Martha Ankomah Foundation was launched in 2016, a social organization founded by Ankomah to provide health awareness, child care support programs, livelihood empowerment and community development projects. Martha through her foundation has donated stationery and other learning materials to many deprived communities including school children at Ackrobon in the Awutu Senya District.

The foundation works together with Autism Ambassadors to develop autism awareness and support children living with autism

References

External links 
 

Ghanaian Christians
1980s births
Living people
Ghanaian film actresses
Ghanaian television actresses
People from Accra